Saint John Calybite (or John Calabites, Calibita, Chalybita, Kalabytes; died ) was a Greek monk and hermit.
He left home at a young age and for several years was a monk in Jerusalem. He returned home disguised as a beggar, and his parents did not recognize him, but gave him a hut to live in. He revealed himself to his mother when on his deathbed. His feast day is 15 January.

Monks of Ramsgate account
The monks of St Augustine's Abbey, Ramsgate, wrote in their Book of Saints (1921),

Roman Martyrology

The Roman Martyrology includes:

Butler's account

The hagiographer Alban Butler ( 1710–1773) wrote in his Lives of the Primitive Fathers, Martyrs, and Other Principal Saints, under January 15,

Notes

Citations

Sources

 

 
 

Greek saints
450 deaths